Common good constitutionalism is a conservative legal theory formulated by Harvard Law Professor Adrian Vermeule that asserts that “the central aim of the constitutional order is to promote good rule, not to ‘protect liberty’ as an end in itself”. Vermeule describes it as an attempt to revive and develop the classical legal tradition by understanding enacted law as a positive application of background natural law principles. Within this tradition, he claims law is defined as "an ordinance of reason promulgated by political authorities for the common good." Vermeule states that law in this sense is "not tethered to particular written instruments of civil law or the will of the legislators who created them" but instead embody rational determinations of the common good, and it is those determinations, as well as the natural law background against which they are made, which constitute the law. Vermeule says that these principles include "a candid willingness to “legislate morality.” 

Common good constitutionalism, as first advanced by Adrian Vermeule in 2020, has been described as a derivative of integralism, both of which were created "to combat the legitimate societal threat of modern liberal individualism and reintroduce the spiritual common good into our political and legal discourse." Vermeule himself argues the notion natural law theory is either just coterminous with Catholic political theory is "both historically and theologically erroneous". Vermeule highlights that historically, natural law theory originates with Greek and Roman philosophers, largely before Christianity became dominant. Theologically, Vermeule argues that "Catholicism itself holds that the natural law is written in the hearts of all men, and is in principle accessible to the universal natural reason common to all". 

Highly controversial, common good constitutionalism is hostile towards both originalism and liberal legal theories such as a living constitution. Former White House Counsel under Ronald Reagan Peter Wallison attacked Vermeule for failing to define "the common good." Wallison also stated that the political order formulated by common good constitutionalism "is highly authoritarian, perhaps even totalitarian" citing Vermeule's assertion that: "Constitutional concepts such as liberty and equality need not be given libertarian or originalist readings."

History 
In an article in The Atlantic in March 2020, Adrian Vermeule suggested that originalism – the idea that the meaning of the American Constitution was fixed at the time of its enactment, which has been the principal legal theory of conservative judges and legal scholars for the past 50 years, but which Vermeule now characterizes as merely "a useful rhetorical and political expedient" – has outlived its usefulness and needs to be replaced by what he calls "common-good constitutionalism".

Common good constitutionalism has garnered a mix of responses, with many praising its recognition of classical legal theories, while others fear that it could lead to judicial fiat. Notably, Richard H. Helmholz, in a review of Common Good Constitutionalism, described it as "a serious contribution to some of the most pressing legal debates of our times." Jack Goldsmith has praised Common Good Constitutionalism as "the most important book of American constitutional theory in many decades". 

However, notable originalist scholar Randy Barnett criticized the theory as subversive of America's founding principles. Conservative columnist George F. Will described Vermeule's "common-good constitutionalism" as "Christian authoritarianism — muscular paternalism, with government enforcing social solidarity for religious reasons."

Notable common good scholars include Adrian Vermeule, Conor Casey, and Michael Foran.

Principles 
Thomas Aquinas defined law as "an ordinance of reason made for the common good by him who has charge of the community, and promulgated". Common good constitutionalism adopts this definition, treating positive law as a promulgated ordinance of reason, where "ordinance of reason" invokes that law which is ascertainable reason, or the natural law. Natural law provides background legal principles, such as "do good and avoid evil," that are not necessarily determinate as applied to concrete cases. Positive law, then, is made when a public authority makes a practical determination within the scope of the natural law. For example, public safety is furthered by having cars drive on one side of the road, but nothing about public safety inherently requires choosing one side of the road or the other. Thus within the requirements of public safety, the public authority is free to determine a concrete application, that is, driving on the left or right side.

In the context of the judiciary, interpretation of legal texts must then be made in light of the natural law principles made concrete by the text. They must be reviewed for rationality, but so long as the positive law does not offend reason—the background natural law principles—the judiciary should defer to the legislating authority. To return to the driving example, to require driving on the left side of the road does not offend reason, nor does driving on the right. Both further the common good by promoting public roadway safety, and thus either determination by the legislature should be deferred to.

"Common good" is defined not as a utilitarian aggregation of individual goods, nor as a tyrannical subjugation of the individual to the community. Rather, it is the unification of individual and community goods that leads to personal and social flourishing. A Navy-Marine Corps Court of Criminal Appeals judge wrote in his concurrence in United States v. Tabor that "[t]he classical judge would attempt to discern what common good is desired by the statute and recognize that a statute can have a purpose toward the good of the individual, a purpose toward the good of the community, and an additional good in harmonizing the interests between the two. A statute—a lex—is an attempt to codify a higher law that a nation or a people all know to be true and good, even if it were to limit individual freedom in certain circumstances." Thus individual goods or rights must be justified in light of their contribution to the flourishing of the community.

Reception 

Common good constitutionalism has divided opinion amongst scholars and lawyers. 

Many natural lawyers have welcomed it as a valuable contribution to legal theory. University of Chicago legal historian Richard Helmholz described Common Good Constitutionalism (Polity, 2022) as a “serious contribution to some of the most pressing legal debates of our times…written…with clarity and skill.” University of Texas law professor Sanford Levinson described it as “truly an important book deserving wide readership and intense discussion”  while University of Michigan law professor Richard Primus saw potential in its “simple and powerful frame” but felt the book "stops short of fully describing the common good that Vermeule envisions." 

Writing in the Modern Law Review, University of Glasgow legal scholar Michael Foran said the theory offers “powerful critiques of the foundational assumptions of liberal constitutionalism”. University of Georgia law professor Eric Segall wrote that common good constitutionalism offers a “critique of the never-ending debates between originalists and living constitutionalists--debates that have not furthered constitutional discourse in a helpful manner.”

One scholar noted its potential relevance for environmental law, stating that “[E]nvironmental advocates can benefit both from considering the common good constitutionalist approach in its own right and as a catalyst for action.”

Various practicing lawyers have praised common good constitutionalism as positively contributing values and rationales that are perceived by some to be missing from the political and judicial discourse.

Common good constitutionalism's grounding in a Catholic moral framework has led to charges that, in practice, it is inherently theocratic. David Dyzenhaus has heavily criticized Vermeule's conception of Common Good Constitutionalism, hailing it an "authoritarian" idea seeking to instill "Christian theocratic rule". He criticizes Vermeule for invoking "justification [via] a body of allegedly timeless and universal principles that animate right-wing Catholics and Evangelicals in the US", and for "worshipping the executive" which can put those ideals into practice.

Linda C. McClain has criticized Common Good Constitutionalism for the moral positions which underpin the conception of the common good adopted by its advocates. In particular, the enthusiasm for restrictions on abortion and reproductive rights and heavy reliance on jurists who endorse "the exclusion of women from full participation in civic, political, and economic life" make her doubt whether women’s rights are reasonably secure under the providence of the common good; the prevalence of 'natural law' values which promote segregation and discrimination, and the fact that Vermeule and his associates are "notably silent about problems like religiously-inspired racism and white supremacy" give rise to further concerns that Common Good Constitutionalism, in practice, advocates for a view of ethics palatable only for religious conservatives who share Vermeule's own moral values. McClain expresses a "profound doubt that a free and equal people... would submit" to the moral framework which common good constitutionalists promote.

References

External links 

 https://iusetiustitium.com/

Conservatism in the United States
Concepts in political philosophy